Antonio Consetti (1686–1766) was an Italian historical painter, born and died in Modena.

Biography

He was represented in the Estense Gallery of his native city, by a Virgin of the Rosary with St Dominic and a St Joseph & Angels. He painted the  Virgin and child with St Rose at the Museo Civico d'Arte di Modena . Along with Pellegrino Spaggiari, he decorated the vault of the Sala dei Cardinali at the Collegio San Carlo of Modena. In 1722, he moved back to Modena to open an Academy of drawing. He was the son of the painter Jacopino Consetti (1651-1726) Among Consetti's pupils were Pietro Boselli who worked mainly in Rome., Silvio Barbini in Modena, and Alessandro Bruggiati

References

1686 births
1766 deaths
17th-century Italian painters
Italian male painters
18th-century Italian painters
Painters from Modena
Italian Baroque painters
18th-century Italian male artists